Barefield may refer to:

 Eddie Barefield (1909–1991), American jazz saxophonist, clarinetist and arranger
 John Barefield (born 1955), former American football linebacker
 Keith Barefield, American football coach
 Sedrick Barefield (born 1996), Filipino–American professional basketball player